Roy Willard Ranum (August 11, 1898 – February 5, 1990) was an American politician and papermaker.

Ranum was born in Sparta, Monroe County, Wisconsin. He moved to Faribault, Minnesota in 1909 and graduated from Fairbault High School in 1918. Ranum then moved to Cloquet, Minnesota, in 1919, and worked as a papermaker for the Northwest Paper Company. He lived with his wife and children in Cloquet.  Ranum served on the Cloquet Civil Service Board and on the Cloquet Park Board. He also served as Mayor of Cloquet from 1939 to 1943 and from 1952 to 1959. Ranum served in the Minnesota Senate from 1943 to 1946 and was a Republican.

References

1898 births
1990 deaths
People from Cloquet, Minnesota
People from Faribault, Minnesota
People from Sparta, Wisconsin
Papermakers
Mayors of places in Minnesota
Republican Party Minnesota state senators